The AFC–CONCACAF play-off of the 2007 FIFA Women's World Cup qualification competition was a two-legged home-and-away tie that decided one spot in the final tournament in China. The play-off was contested by the fourth-placed team from the AFC, Japan, and the third-placed team from CONCACAF, Mexico.

Qualified teams

Summary
The draw for the order of legs was held at the Westin Hotel in Tokyo, Japan on 15 December 2006.

|}

Matches

Japan won 3–2 on aggregate and qualified for 2007 FIFA Women's World Cup.

Goalscorers

References

External links
FIFA website

Play-off
Japan at the 2007 FIFA Women's World Cup
Japan women's national football team matches
Mexico women's national football team matches
March 2007 sports events in Asia
March 2007 sports events in North America
2007 in Japanese women's football
2006–07 in Mexican football
2007
2007